Granite Chief is a mountain located in the Sierra Nevada near Lake Tahoe.

The summit is the highest point in the Granite Chief Wilderness and marks the northwestern boundary of Palisades Tahoe.

References

External links
 
 

Mountains of the Sierra Nevada (United States)
Mountains of Placer County, California
Mountains of Northern California